Fairyland is a rural locality in the Western Downs Region, Queensland, Australia.

Geography 
Fairyland is a rural locality. The land in the northernmost part of the locality is part of Barakula State Forest, while the land in the southeastern part of the locality is part of Nudley State Forest.

Road infrastructure
The Chinchilla–Wondai Road passes the south-eastern corner.

History 
The locality name is presumably derived from the Fairyland pastoral run, which in 1863 had an estimated carrying capacity of 4,000 sheep.

Nudley State School opened on 24 November 1913 and closed in 1956. It was on Nudley School Road.

Fairyland West Provisional School opened on 1 May 1941, becoming Fairyland West State School on 26 April 1957. It closed in 1980. It was located on Fairyland School Road, just east of Charleys Creek (approx ), now within the neighbouring locality of Durah.

References

Further reading 

  — includes Nudley State School

Western Downs Region
Localities in Queensland